Emilee Wallace (born September 19, 1989) is an American actress.

Career
Wallace began her acting career in 2005. She has appeared in episodes of the television series Judging Amy (2005), Grey's Anatomy (2006), Cold Case (2008), Boston Legal (2008), Glee (2009, 2013), Ghost Whisperer (2010), Workaholics (2012), Rizzoli & Isles (2012−13). Apart from television work, she also appeared on the television films Company Town (2006) and Amish Grace (2010), and her first feature film Balls Out: Gary the Tennis Coach (2008).

Filmography

Film

Television

Personal life
Wallace was born in Oklahoma City and raised in Edmond, Oklahoma. She currently resides in Los Angeles, California.

References

External links

1989 births
Living people
Actresses from Oklahoma City
People from Edmond, Oklahoma
American television actresses
American film actresses
21st-century American actresses
California State University alumni